In geometry, a central triangle is a triangle in the plane of the reference triangle the trilinear coordinates of whose vertices relative to the reference triangle are expressible in a certain cyclical way in terms of two functions having the same degree of homogeneity. At least one of the two functions must be a triangle center function. The excentral triangle is an example for a central triangle. The central triangles have been classified into three types based on the properties of the two functions.

Definition

Triangle center function 
A triangle center function is a real valued function F(u,v,w) of three real variables u, v, w having the following properties:

Homogeneity property: F(tu,tv,tw) = tn F(u,v,w) for some constant n and for all t > 0. The constant n is the degree of homogeneity of the function F(u,v,w).
Bisymmetry property: F(u,v,w) = F(u,w,v)

Central triangles of Type 1 

Let f(u,v,w) and g(u,v,w) be two triangle center functions, not both identically zero functions, having the same degree of homogeneity. Let a, b, c be the side lengths of the reference triangle ABC. An (f,g)-central triangle of Type 1 is a triangle A'B'C' the trilinear coordinates of whose vertices have the following form:

A' = f(a,b,c) : g(b,c,a) : g(c,a,b)
B' = g(a,b,c) : f(b,c,a) : g(c,a,b)
C' = g(a,b,c) : g(b,c,a) : f(c,a,b)

Central triangles of Type 2 
Let f(u,v,w) be a triangle center function and g(u,v,w) be a function function satisfying the homogeneity property and having the same degree of homogeneity as f(u,v,w) but not satisfying the bisymmetry property. An (f,g)-central triangle of Type 2 is a triangle A'B'C' the trilinear coordinates of whose vertices have the following form:

A' = f(a,b,c) : g(b,c,a) : g(c,b,a)
B' = g(a,c,b) : f(b,c,a) : g(c,a,b)
C' = g(a,b,c) : g(b,a,c) : f(c,a,b)

Central triangles of Type 3 
Let g(u,v,w) be a triangle center function. An g-central triangle of Type 3 is a triangle A'B'C' the trilinear coordinates of whose vertices have the following form:

A' = 0 : g(b,c,a) : - g(c,b,a)
B' = - g(a,c,b) : 0 : g(c,a,b)
C' = g(a,b,c) : - g(b,a,c) : 0

This is a degenerate triangle in the sense that the points A'. B', C' are collinear.

Special cases
If f = g, the (f,g)-central triangle of Type 1 degenerates to the triangle center A'. All central triangles of both Type 1 and Type 2 relative to an equilateral triangle degenerate to a point.

Examples

Type 1 
The excentral triangle of triangle ABC is a central triangle of Type 1. This is obtained by taking f(u,v,w) = -1 and g(u,v,w) = 1.

Let X be a triangle center defined by the triangle center function g(a,b,c). Then the cevian triangle of X is a (0, g)-central triangle of Type 1.

Let X be a triangle center defined by the triangle center function f(a,b,c). Then the anticevian triangle of X is a ( - f, f)-central triangle of Type 1.

The (f, g)-central triangle with f(a,b,c) = a(2S+SA) and g(a,b,c) = aSA, where S is twice the area of triangle ABC and SA = (1/2)(b2 + c2 - a2), is the Lucas central triangle.

Type 2 
Let X be a triangle center. The pedal and antipedal triangles of X are central triangles of Type 2.
Yff Central Triangle

References

Triangle geometry